Tinson Pen Aerodrome  in Kingston, Jamaica is the largest of Jamaica's three domestic airports. It is located on Marcus Garvey Drive, a major highway that links Kingston to the nearby residential community of Portmore. The airport is also located near the Kingston Free Zone, a transshipment port. The airport caters mainly to business travellers. The airport also provides a vital commercial link between the cities of Kingston and Montego Bay.

Tinson Pen Aerodrome handled approximately 92,091 passengers in 2001. The airport formerly had scheduled passenger service provided by Air Jamaica Express and International AirLink.

Facilities
There is a 100LL fueling station and the airport supports night flight operations.

Passengers
The following table shows the number of passengers using the airport annually from 1997 through 2001.

References

External links
 

Airports in Jamaica
Buildings and structures in Kingston, Jamaica